Nour El Sherbini (born 1 November 1995) is an Egyptian professional squash player. She is a six time World champion and became the youngest woman to win the Women's World Championship (2015). In 2016, she retained her title and in 2019 won her third World Championship equalling the feat of Michelle Martin and rising to  equal fourth in the all-time list of world championships won. She is the current world champion after winning the 2021/2022 edition of the tournament.

Early life
Nour was born and has been raised in Alexandria, Egypt. She started playing squash when she was 6 years old, and was already participating in tournaments before she was 8.

She is training in Alexandria Sporting Club (ASC) in Alexandria-EGYPT.

Her brother Omar el Sherbini kept her interested in squash as she would spend time watching him and learning from his sessions. She confirmed that sports run in her family: "My father used to be a football player and a good swimmer. Also my mum was a good athlete".

Early career
She won the British Junior Open Under-13 category in 2007 and 2008. On 28 November 2009, Sherbini was awarded the 2009 Young WISPA Squash Player of the Year. As she explains: "By time I gained more confidence and become more steady that made me able to win most of the titles of the local tournaments in Egypt, till reaching the British open and my first international titles. My first BJO title was such a push for more titles starting from under 13 years old till under 15, titles in a row".

A few months after her 13th birthday, she joined WISPA in early 2009, and in April she announced her arrival by losing to world top liner Engy Kheirallah in a tight 3/1 at the Heliopolis Open. After having reached the final of the ATCO Miro event in June, also in Cairo, Sherbini was stopped by Kheirallah in her bid for her first WISPA Tour title. On August 2, 2009, at 13, Sherbini became the youngest world champion in the history of the sport when she won the women's title at the World Junior squash Championships (U-19). As she explained: "Reaching the most important moment of my life, I was chosen to represent Egypt in the world open junior championship taking place in Chennai, India. To win the title was a dream, but to take it and feel the taste of victory was a dream came true. Adding the World Team title made it looks extraordinary".

2012: Entering the top 10
In four years on the WSA World Tour, Nour El Sherbini rose 208 places in the women's rankings to occupy the world No. 7 spot at the age of 16.

Her first professional competition came in the Heliopolis Open as a qualifier, and she made it to the first round. The following January she won the British Junior Under-19 Open at the age of 14, at which point she had already broken into the world's top 50. She returned to Heliopolis in 2010 to claim her first WSA title. The following year, still climbing the rankings and sitting at No. 36, she won the Alexandria International Open as 5th seed and finished the year by reaching round two of the World Open as a qualifier.

In 2012 Sherbini made semi-final appearances in the Tournament of Champions in New York, as well as in the KL Open in Malaysia. These results tipped Sherbini into the world top 20, and she reached the final of the WSA World Series Platinum Allam British Open event at the O2 Arena, where she lost to Nicol David. On 19 May 2012, Sherbini defeated Raneem El Weleily to become the youngest-ever British Open women's finalist. Also in 2012, she was part of the team that regained the world team title after winning a gold medal at the 2012 Women's World Team Squash Championships.

In 2014, she was part of the Egyptian team that won the bronze medal at the 2014 Women's World Team Squash Championships.

World champion and world No.1
She reached a world ranking of No. 1 in April 2016. Also in 2016, she won her second world team title as part of the Egyptian team that won the gold medal at the 2016 Women's World Team Squash Championships.

In 2018, she won her third world team title as part of the Egyptian team that won the 2018 Women's World Team Squash Championships. In 2022, she was part of the Egyptian team that won the 2022 Women's World Team Squash Championships. It was her fourth world team title.

World Squash Championships

Finals: 8 (6 titles, 2 runner-up)

Major World Series final appearances

British Open: 4 finals (3 titles, 1 runner-up)

Qatar Classic: 1 final (0 title, 1 runner-up)

Awards and achievements

 British Junior Open Champion GU13 2007
 British Junior Open Champion GU13 2008
 British Junior Open Champion GU15 2009
 Atco Miro No.1 WISPA Runner-up 2009
 World Junior Champion 2009
 Young WISPA Player of the Year 2009
 Young Female Player of the Year 2009
 British Junior Open Champion GU19 2010
 Heliopolis Open WISPA Champion 2010
 High WISPA Ranking of 25 October 2010
 World Junior Runner-up 2011
 Alexandria International Open WISPA Champion 2011
 British Junior Open Champion GU19 2012
 High WSA Ranking of 7 June 2012
 Youngest ever to reach the final of the British open in 2012
 The first Egyptian to reach the final of the British Open in 2012
 Youngest ever to be in the top ten on the world reaching No. 7 in June 2012
 World Junior Champion 2012
 The first Egyptian to win the British Open (in 2016)
 PSA Player of The Year 2017/18

References

External links 

 
 
 

1995 births
Living people
Egyptian female squash players
Sportspeople from Alexandria
21st-century Egyptian women